The spine–legged redbolt, also known as rufous marsh glider, and common redbolt, (Rhodothemis rufa) is a species of dragonfly in the family Libellulidae. It is widespread in many Asian countries.

Description and habitat
It is a medium sized dragonfly with red eyes, thorax and abdomen. But young males and females have a mid-dorsal citron-yellow stripe in the pro-thorax and a citron-yellow stripe on mid-dorsum of the abdominal segments. These marks get obscured by pruinescence in adult males. Color of female is brown. It breeds in open ponds, marshes and lakes.

See also 

 List of odonates of Sri Lanka
 List of odonates of India
 List of odonata of Kerala

References

 rufa.html World Dragonflies
 Animal diversity web
 Query Results
 Sri Lanka Biodiversity

External links

Libellulidae
Insects described in 1842